Tracy Smith may refer to:

Tracy Smith (runner) (born 1945)
Tracy Smith (long jumper) (born 1964)
Tracy Smith (baseball) (born 1966), college baseball coach
Tracy Smith (journalist) (born 1966)
Tracy K. Smith (born 1972), American Poet Laureate and educator
Tracey Smith, a character from the television series Firefly